Chucñuma (possibly from Aymara ch'uxña green, uma water, "green water") is a mountain in the northern extensions of the Barroso mountain range in the Andes of Peru, about  high. It is situated in the Tacna Region, Tarata Province, Tarata District. Chucñuma lies northwest of Casiri Lake and north of the mountains Chontacollo and Pacollo.

References 

Mountains of Tacna Region
Mountains of Peru